William Russell Morris  (1853–1936) was the second Public Service Commissioner in New Zealand. He was born in Dublin, and joined the New Zealand Post Office in 1875. He was appointed a Companion of the Imperial Service Order in the 1917 Birthday Honours, and made a Companion of the Order of St Michael and St George in the 1919 New Year Honours.

He married Edith Miranda Mountfoot (1857–1938) in 1877.

References
Who's Who in New Zealand 2nd edition (1925) 

1853 births
1936 deaths
New Zealand public servants
New Zealand Companions of the Order of St Michael and St George
Irish emigrants to New Zealand (before 1923)
New Zealand Companions of the Imperial Service Order